The 1983 NCAA Division I Men's Golf Championships was the 45th annual NCAA-sanctioned golf tournament to determine the individual and team national champions of men's collegiate golf at the University Division level in the United States.

The tournament was held at the San Joaquin Country Club in Fresno, California.

Oklahoma Staten won the team championship, the Cowboys' fifth NCAA title.

Jim Carter, from Arizona State, won the individual title.

Individual results

Individual champion
 Jim Carter, Arizona State

Team results

Finalists

Missed cut

DC = Defending champions
Debut appearance

References

NCAA Men's Golf Championship
Golf in California
NCAA Golf Championship
NCAA Golf Championship
NCAA Golf Championship